Hasibe Erkoç (née Özer) is a Turkish female boxer. She is a member of the TSE club in Ankara, Turkey.

Career
She represented her country in the Flyweight (50 kg) category  at the 4th World Women's Boxing Championship held between November 18 and 23, 2006 in New Delhi, India. She won a gold medal and Şemsi Yaralı won a bronze medal for Turkey. Hasibe Erkoç became world champion, defeating Li Siyuan from China in the final by 18-12.

Her parents Muhsin Özer and Emine live in Tokat, Turkey. As a young girl, Hasibe was interested in martial arts, and started  with taekwondo, and then continued with kickboxing. However, in 1991, a foot injury forced her to switch to boxing.

References

External links
 Superonline 
 NTV Spor 

Turkish women boxers
Living people
Flyweight boxers
Year of birth missing (living people)
AIBA Women's World Boxing Championships medalists
World flyweight boxing champions